Lanes Creek Township, population 2,650, is one of nine townships in Union County, North Carolina. This township does not have any towns or cities within it.

Geography
The northern and western parts of the township are drained by Lanes Creek and its tributaries, Waxhaw Branch, Carolina Creek, Wicker Branch and Norkett Branch.  The southeast side is drained by Brown Creek and its tributary, Little Brown Creek.  The northwestern side is drained by Rone Branch.

References

Townships in Union County, North Carolina
Townships in North Carolina